Farid Mustafevich Seiful-Mulyukov (November 19, 1930 – June 4, 2016) was a Soviet, Russian and international journalist, writer, orientalist, Arabist, a leading television Central Television and honored Artist of Russia (1995). He was also the author of numerous reports from around the world on one of Russia's leading television programs In The World Today and for the international Panorama

Awards 
 Medal "For Labour Valour" (1970)
 Order of the Red Banner of Labor (1976) 
 Order of the Red Star (1982) 
Vasilyev Brothers State Prize of the RSFSR (1978)
USSR State Prize (1981)
Honored Artist of Russia (1995)

References

External links
 Все, с кем я встречался, были мне интересны
 Интервью с Фаридом Сейфуль-Мулюковым

1930 births
2016 deaths
Mass media people from Tashkent
Russian journalists
Soviet writers
Soviet journalists
Russian male journalists
Soviet television presenters
Russian television presenters
Recipients of the USSR State Prize
Recipients of the Vasilyev Brothers State Prize of the RSFSR
Recipients of the Order of Honour (Russia)
Tatar people of Russia
20th-century Russian male writers